Javier Vargas may refer to:
Javier Vargas (footballer)
Javier Vargas (musician)